Carl Robert Disch (presumed dead in 1965) was an ionospheric physicist for the National Bureau of Standards who went missing near Byrd Station, Antarctica, on May 8, 1965.

Disappearance
Disch was stationed at the radio noise building of Byrd Station to work on his ionospheric studies. When Disch had not arrived at the main station within a reasonable time, a search party departed the station to search for him. His trail was spotted but the search party had to return to the station to refuel. Upon their return, the trail had been covered by drifting snow and was never rediscovered. Despite exhaustive searches and measures taken to make the station more visible, including firing of flares and illuminating extra floodlights, Disch was never found.

The search was called off on May 14. He is presumed dead and his body has never been recovered. Memorial services were held in his hometown of Monroe, Wisconsin. He was 26 years old.

Conspiracy
The disappearance of Disch has spawned many conspiracy theories. They are given legitimacy by an alleged message transmitted to McMurdo Station in 1971. The author of the message, claiming to be Disch, stated that he was alive. The message has been disregarded as a hoax.

Legacy
The Disch Promontory is named in his honor.

See also
List of people who disappeared

References

1960s missing person cases
American physicists
American Antarctic scientists
Deaths in Antarctica
Missing people
People declared dead in absentia